Aorangi may refer to:

 Aoraki / Mount Cook, a name for New Zealand's highest mountain
 Aorangi Island, the smaller of the two large islands that make up the Poor Knights Islands
 Aorangi Oval, a cricket ground in Timaru
 Aorangi Range, the southernmost mountain range of New Zealand's North Island
 Aorangi School, a former school in Christchurch
 Aorangi (ship), several ships of this name
 Aorangi Terrace,  an area in the grounds of the All England Lawn Tennis and Croquet Club
 Feilding, known as Aorangi in Māori
 Mount Aorangi, the highest mountain in the Millen Range of Antarctica